Pedro César Dominici (Carúpano, estado Sucre, Venezuela, February 18, 1873 – Buenos Aires, Argentina, August 23, 1954) was a writer, playwright and Venezuelan diplomat.

Biography 
Co-founder of the magazine Cosmópolis with Luis Urbaneja Archepohl and his friend and writer Pedro Emilio Coll.He published several works for the magazine El Cojo Ilustrado and was the founder of two newspapers of Carúpano, El Noticiero and El Bien Público.  He was director of the magazine Venezuela between 1905 and 1909 in París; this magazine circulated only clandestinely in Venezuela.

Represented Venezuela in the Government of Juan Vicente Gómez as Extraordinary Envoy and Minister Plenipotentiary in Italy, Spain, England, Argentina, Chile and Uruguay. In 1890 was General Consul in Rome.

Theater 

 The Man Who Returned (drama, 1949) 
 The House (Dramatic comedy, 1949)
 The Sad Venus (Comedy, 1950)
 Angelica (Dramatic comedy, 1950)
 The Golden Cage (Dramatic comedy, 1950)
 Red Love, The Drama of the Crowds, (1951)

Works 

 Ideas and Impressions (París, 1897)
 Voluptuous Sadness (Novel, Caracas, 1899)
 The Triumph of the Ideal (Novela, París, 1901)
 A Stratopra (Novel, Caracas 1901)
 Dionysos (Novel, 1904)
 Apollonian Book (Chronicles and Essays, Caracas, 1909)
 Vacant Thrones (Reviews, Buenos Aires, 1914)
 The Condor (Novel, Buenos Aires, 1925)
 Under the Autumn Sun (Buenos Aires, 1947)
 Evocation (The novel of an unhappy love) (Novel, 1949)

References

Bibliography

External links 

People from Carúpano
Venezuelan short story writers
Venezuelan male short story writers
Ambassadors of Venezuela to Argentina
Ambassadors of Venezuela to Chile
Ambassadors of Venezuela to Spain
Ambassadors of Venezuela to Uruguay
Ambassadors of Venezuela to the United Kingdom
Venezuelan writers
1954 deaths
Members of the Venezuelan Academy of Language
1873 births
Venezuelan novelists